Colm Collins is a Gaelic football manager, associated with Cratloe GAA club.

Career
Collins is a native of Kilmihil. He began managing Clare in late 2013 and became the longest-serving inter-county football manager when Mickey Harte left Tyrone.

Collins led Clare from Division 4 to Division 3 of the National Football League, then to Division 2 where he consolidated his team's position. He led Clare to the 2016 All-Ireland Senior Football Championship qauerter-finals. He stayed on as Clare's manager for 2018. At the end of that year he became the fourth longest-serving manager after Mickey Harte, Jim Gavin and Malachy O'Rourke. At the end of 2019, the third longest, he announced then that he would take time to consider his future after Clare's championship exit. He led Clare to the 2022 All-Ireland Senior Football Championship quarter-finals, when they had the beating of Roscommon.

Kieran McGeeney was reappointed for the 2023 season, having been appointed as Armagh manager in 2014.

With his appointment for a tenth season at the end of 2022, Collins became the longest serving inter-county manager in either code (since Brian Cody had earlier resigned as Kilkenny hurling manager).

Personal life
His son, Podge, is a footballer and hurler. Podge concentrated on the football for 2015. He concentrated on the football for 2021, from '14 up until '16, he did the two teams but only hurling in '17.

References

External links

Year of birth missing (living people)
Living people
Gaelic football managers
People from County Clare